Micronesian outliers are some islands near New Guinea inhabited by Micronesian settlers. All of the Micronesian outliers are in the Bismarck Sea and belong to Papua New Guinea. These islands are also known under the name Western Islands

The Micronesian outliers, also name Para-Micronesia, are:
 Hermit Islands
 Aua
 Wuvulu
 Kaniet Islands
 Sae Island
 Ninigo Islands

Bismarck Archipelago
Archipelagoes of Papua New Guinea
Manus Province
Islands of Papua New Guinea